"Big Wheel" is a song written and recorded by Tori Amos.  It was chosen as the first single from her album American Doll Posse. However, multiple radio stations rejected "Big Wheel" because the acronym MILF is repeated in the bridge of the song. An edited version was played on some radio stations that eliminated the MILF acronym, changing it to "M-I-M-I".

Music video
The music video for "Big Wheel", based on the concept of still photographs coming to life, is a slide show of pictures from Blaise Reutersward's photo shoot for Amos's album. The music video, for which Amos is credited as the director, premiered on Yahoo! Music on April 18, 2007.

Tracklist 
Digital Single
 "Big Wheel" - 3:18
 "Drive All Night" - 4:06

Charts 
For the week ending April 6, 2007, the single was the most-added to Triple A radio stations across the United States. The song peaked at #6 on the Triple A charts, #115 on Hot Digital Songs, and #12 on the Billboard Bubbling Under Hot 100 Singles chart.

References

2006 songs
2007 singles
Tori Amos songs
Songs written by Tori Amos
Epic Records singles